Fula people of Sierra Leone (Pular: 𞤊𞤵𞤤𞤩𞤫 𞤅𞤢𞤪𞤤𞤮𞤲)  is the fourth major ethnic group in Sierra Leone after the Temne, Mende and Limba ethnic groups and a branch of the Fula people of West Africa. The Fula make up about 10% of Sierra Leone's population. The  Sierra Leone Fula people settled in the Western Area region of Sierra Leone more than four hundred years ago as settlers from the Fouta Djallon Kingdom that expanded to northern Sierra Leone (Kabala, Bombali).

The Sierra Leonean Fula are traditionally a nomadic, pastoralist, trading people, herding cattle, goats and sheep across the vast dry hinterlands of their domain, keeping somewhat separate from the local agricultural populations. Many of the large shopping centers in Sierra Leone are owned and run by the Fula community.

Today over 99% of Sierra Leonean Fula are Muslims of the   Sunni tradition of Islam. The overwhelming majority of Fula are adherent to the Maliki School within Sunni Islam. A significant number of the Sierra Leonean Fula population are found in all regions of Sierra Leone as traders.

The Fulas have been migrating and settling within Sierra Leone since the 17th Century. Many Fulas today in Sierra Leone are  descendants of those who fled the autocratic rule of president Ahmed Sekou Toure and found refuge in the 1960s and 1970s. Others are new arrivals of the last decades due to the open borders that the Mano River Union and globalisation have created in the West African region.

Family
The Sierra Leonean Fula villages are scattered, but each has a central court and a mosque. Together, these compose a miside (community). Each miside has a sub-chief who handles village affairs and who answers to a Sultan (chief). The homes of the settled Fula are round with clay walls and thatched roofs that projects over encircling porches. However, nomadic Fula live in simpler structures, since they are so often moving with the herds. These houses have neither walls nor verandahs, and are encircled by cattle corrals.

Daughters remain with their mothers until they marry. However, as soon as a son reaches puberty, he leaves the family compound and lives alone in a nearby compound, usually taking over a part of his fathers trade. This new compound will be the home of the son and his future wife.

Religious and traditional beliefs
The majority of Sierra Leonean Fulanis are Muslims. Few Christians can be found among them. Some of them practice herbal healings.

The "herd owner's feast" is one such ceremony. During this feast, a bull that has served ten seasons is presented, killed, and eaten.

The history of these peoples are of Arabs who settle in the region.

The Fula people also utilize practices of the Bondo secret society which aims at gradually but firmly  establishing attitudes related to adulthood in girls, discussions on fertility, morality and proper sexual comportment. The society also maintains an interest in the well-being of its members throughout their lives.

Farming
The Sierra Leonean Fula are primarily skilled traders in diamonds, gems, gold, lending but formerly cattle, with their lives depending upon and revolving around trade cattle herds prior to the 19th century. The status of a family can be determined by the size and health of its trade. The more a man knows about trade, the greater respect he is given by the community.

Trade is usually a male activity; however, the women tend to act as accountants for the family. They also tend to the small livestock and poultry, cultivate gardens, and carry containers of milk and cheese to the local markets for sell or trade. As Fula people are Muslim, a woman has all the rights and concerns provided her under Islam. In the Fula Family a mother is 7 times the father, as it pertains to respect and a mothers rights under Islam.

Notable Sierra Leonean Fula people
Abubakarr Jalloh, former Sierra Leone Minister of Mineral Resources
Abu Bakarr Bah, Ph.D.: Professor of Sociology, Northern Illinois University, IL, USA and Editor-in-Chief, African Conflict & Peacebuilding Review
Alhaji M.B. Jalloh, former Sierra Leone ambassador to Saudi Arabia and the Persian Gulf States
Alpha Rashid Jalloh notable journalist and now magistrate
Alimamy Jalloh, Sierra Leonean football star
Alimamy Rassin, Sierra Leonean Fula chief during colonial period
Alhaji Amadu Jalloh, Sierra Leonean opposition politician and leader of the National Democratic Alliance political 
Amadu Wurie, early Sierra Leonean educationist and politician
Abass Bundu, Speaker of the Sierra Leone Parliament
Chernor Maju Bah, current Majority leader of the opposition
Amadu Wurie, First Minister of Education of Sierra Leone 
Alpha Wurie, Sierra Leone former minister of Health
Alhaji Mohamed Bailor Barrie, Prominent Sierra Leonean businessman, tribal leader, activist, and philanthropist in the 1970s and 1980s
Ibrahim Bah (nickname Inspector Bah), Retired Sierra Leonean footballer
Ibrahim Bundu, former majority leader of the Sierra Leone Parliament
 Khalifa Jabbie
Mamadu Alphajor Bah, Sierra Leonean football star
Mohamed Juldeh Jalloh, current vice president of Sierra Leone
Momodu Allieu Pat-Sowe, former Transportation minister of Sierra Leone
Rashid Wurie, former Sierra Leonean international football star
Sajoh Bah, African languages advocate, author and poet,
 Mohamed Kanu

References

See also
 Koinadugu District

 
Ethnic groups in Sierra Leone
Muslim communities in Sierra Leone
Female genital mutilation
Female genital mutilation by country